Ballinlough is a mainly residential townland and suburb on the southside of Cork city, in Ireland. It is located between Ballintemple and the larger suburbs of Douglas and Blackrock.

History

Among the earliest written references to the townland and then village of Ballinlough date from 1601 (as "Ballinlogha") in the Calendar to Fiants of reign of Henry VIII, and from 1655 (as "Ballinloghy") in the Down Survey. These Irish language names (the town of the lake) reflected the position of the village focal-points (including Ballinlough House and the original Ballinlough school), close to Lough Mahon and the Douglas River Estuary. The Ballinlough Stone, a standing stone near Ballinlough House, was surveyed by antiquary Thomas Crofton Croker in the early 19th century. Later archaeological surveys of the stone question whether its origins are prehistoric, or if it is a less ancient boundary marker.

In the 19th century, land use in the area was mainly focused on farming and market gardening. The larger farms were managed from estate houses including Ballinlough House, Ardfallen House, Thorn Hill House, and LakeVille/Ravenscourt.

From the early 20th century, with Cork city expanding east, and the village expanding west, the area became more suburbanised. This included the building of housing developments during the 1920s and 1930s in the neighbouring and sub-townlands of Browingstown, Coppingers Stang, and Knockrea. Early 20th century censuses however still recorded 17 market gardeners in the area. With the construction of a new church in 1938, two additional schools in 1944 and 1965, and a later community centre, the focal-points of the (now) suburb shifted westward towards the city. Previously separated by remaining green belts and outside the city's administrative area, Ballinlough is now within the Cork City Council administrative boundary and zoned as a suburban residential area.

Amenities
There are three primary schools situated in Ballinlough: St. Anthony's Boys National School, Eglantine Girls National School, and Our Lady of Lourdes Girls National School. A further primary school, Rockboro School, lies on the border with South Parish on the Boreenmana Road.

The community centre in Ballinough includes a public park and a number of buildings which host community activities. The main building hosts a Montessori school, bowls and bingo events. The 38th/40th Cork Scout Group (a member of Scouting Ireland) is also based on the community centre site, as is the youth club (which is affiliated with Ógra Chorcaí).

Ballinlough Tennis Club has five outdoor courts in the community centre complex, and is accredited to Tennis Ireland's "gold" standard for facilities and club management. The Páirc Uí Rinn Gaelic Athletic Association grounds and the Cork Constitution rugby club lie on the border between Ballinlough and Ballintemple.

Ballinlough is an independent Roman Catholic parish of the Cork and Ross Catholic Diocese and is home to Our Lady of Lourdes Church. It is also the location of the Wesley chapel of the Cork Methodist Church - which also operates a sheltered housing complex from the grounds of Ardfallen House.

Notable residents
 Ray Cummins - former Cork hurling and Gaelic football dual player, was born in Ballinlough
 Micheál Martin - leader of Fianna Fáil and 15th Taoiseach, resides in Ballinlough
 Eimear Ryan - author, lives in Ballinlough

References

Geography of Cork (city)